The Creature Cases is a preschool computer animated children's streaming television series developed by Gabe Pulliam for Netflix. Produced by Silvergate Media, the series premiered on April 12, 2022. A holiday special, labeled as Chapter 2, was released on November 30, 2022. A third season/chapter is set for a 2023 release.

Series overview

Episodes

Chapter 1 (2022)

Chapter 2 (2022)

Production
The series was first announced back in September 2021 as part of four Netflix Original Preschool shows targeted at 2-6 year olds.

Release
The Creature Cases was globally released on April 12, 2022, on Netflix. A trailer was released on March 29, 2022.

Reception

The series received a 5/5 rating on Common Sense Media where Diondra Brown praised it for being both educational and entertaining, especially for those that love learning about animals.

References

External links

2022 American television series debuts
2020s American animated television series
2020s American children's comedy television series
2020s preschool education television series
American children's animated comedy television series
American computer-animated television series
American preschool education television series
Animated preschool education television series
Animated television series about animals
Detective television series
English-language Netflix original programming
Netflix children's programming
Television series about animals